Joseph Amoah may refer to:

 Joseph Amoah (footballer, born 1981), Ghana-born Liberian football player
 Joseph Amoah (footballer, born 1994), Ghanaian football player
 Joseph Amoah (sprinter) (born 1997), Ghanaian sprinter